Echmepteryx is a genus of scaly-winged barklice in the family Lepidopsocidae. There are more than 80 described species in Echmepteryx.

Species
These 81 species belong to the genus Echmepteryx:

 Echmepteryx acuminata Turner, 1975
 Echmepteryx acutipennis Enderlein, 1931
 Echmepteryx aesculana Enderlein, 1931
 Echmepteryx albigena Schmidt & Thornton, 1993
 Echmepteryx alpha Garcia Aldrete, 1984
 Echmepteryx angusta New, 1975
 Echmepteryx annulitibia (Enderlein, 1931)
 Echmepteryx anomala Smithers & Thornton, 1975
 Echmepteryx aperta Thornton & Woo, 1973
 Echmepteryx argenta Turner, 1975
 Echmepteryx argentofasciata (Enderlein, 1931)
 Echmepteryx armillata Enderlein, 1910
 Echmepteryx atlantica Mockford, 1989
 Echmepteryx barba Turner, 1975
 Echmepteryx bicolor Turner, 1975
 Echmepteryx bishopi New, 1975
 Echmepteryx brunnea Smithers, 1965
 Echmepteryx carolinensis Thornton, Lee & Chui, 1972
 Echmepteryx chagosensis New, 1977
 Echmepteryx chekei Turner, 1976
 Echmepteryx desquamata Karny, 1932
 Echmepteryx diexquadra Badonnel, 1981
 Echmepteryx dryas (Enderlein, 1931)
 Echmepteryx dybasi Thornton, Lee & Chui, 1972
 Echmepteryx falco (Badonnel, 1949)
 Echmepteryx fastigata (Enderlein, 1931)
 Echmepteryx frontalis Vaughan, Thornton & New, 1991
 Echmepteryx fuscata New, 1975
 Echmepteryx gracilis Mockford, 2012
 Echmepteryx gumpi Thornton, 1990
 Echmepteryx hageni (Packard, 1870)
 Echmepteryx hamiltoni (Tillyard, 1923)
 Echmepteryx hartmeyeri Enderlein, 1907
 Echmepteryx hebes (Enderlein, 1931)
 Echmepteryx hieroglyphica Enderlein, 1931
 Echmepteryx howensis Smithers & Thornton, 1975
 Echmepteryx humphreysi New, 1977
 Echmepteryx intermedia Mockford, 1974
 Echmepteryx lacinipennis Enderlein, 1926
 Echmepteryx lawrencei Smithers, 1995
 Echmepteryx lealae New, 1972
 Echmepteryx lineata Vaughan, Thornton & New, 1991
 Echmepteryx lunulata Thornton, Lee & Chui, 1972
 Echmepteryx lurida Badonnel, 1967
 Echmepteryx lutosa Mockford, 1991
 Echmepteryx macgregori Garcia Aldrete, 1985
 Echmepteryx maculimargo Enderlein, 1931
 Echmepteryx madagascariensis (Kolbe, 1885)
 Echmepteryx mahensis (Enderlein, 1931)
 Echmepteryx malayensis New, 1975
 Echmepteryx mihira Enderlein, 1906
 Echmepteryx montana Turner, 1975
 Echmepteryx monticola (Enderlein, 1931)
 Echmepteryx muscicolis Badonnel, 1977
 Echmepteryx nigra (Enderlein, 1931)
 Echmepteryx nigrapalpa Turner, 1975
 Echmepteryx pacifica Garcia Aldrete, 1985
 Echmepteryx pallida Smithers, 1965
 Echmepteryx pauliani Badonnel, 1967
 Echmepteryx picta Smithers, 1977
 Echmepteryx picticeps Thornton, Lee & Chui, 1972
 Echmepteryx pinnula (Enderlein, 1931)
 Echmepteryx pletschi Garcia Aldrete, 1985
 Echmepteryx psyche (Enderlein, 1931)
 Echmepteryx punctulata (Enderlein, 1931)
 Echmepteryx quadrilineata Smithers, 1965
 Echmepteryx rara Turner, 1975
 Echmepteryx renoides Schmidt & Thornton, 1993
 Echmepteryx schrankeli Garcia Aldrete, 2001
 Echmepteryx scotti (Enderlein, 1931)
 Echmepteryx sericea Enderlein, 1906
 Echmepteryx similis Badonnel, 1955
 Echmepteryx stylesi Smithers, 1969
 Echmepteryx submontana Turner, 1975
 Echmepteryx symmetrolepis (Enderlein, 1912)
 Echmepteryx terricolis Badonnel, 1963
 Echmepteryx unicolor Banks, 1931
 Echmepteryx uniformis Mockford, 1991
 Echmepteryx vitiensis Thornton, 1981
 Echmepteryx yanezi Garcia Aldrete, 1984
 Echmepteryx youngi Mockford, 1974

References

External links

 

Trogiomorpha
Taxa named by Samuel Francis Aaron
Articles created by Qbugbot